Juan Rolón (born 31 January 1930) is an Argentine former wrestler. He competed at the 1956 Summer Olympics and the 1960 Summer Olympics.

References

External links
 

1930 births
Possibly living people
Argentine male sport wrestlers
Olympic wrestlers of Argentina
Wrestlers at the 1956 Summer Olympics
Wrestlers at the 1960 Summer Olympics
Sportspeople from Buenos Aires
Pan American Games medalists in wrestling
Pan American Games silver medalists for Argentina
Wrestlers at the 1955 Pan American Games
20th-century Argentine people
21st-century Argentine people